Heart-Aid Shisen was a major fund raising concert held on July 14, 2008 in Tokyo, Japan for the victims of the 2008 Sichuan earthquake. Featuring artists from across East Asia (most of whom were well known in Japan), the concert was organized by Jackie Chan and Judy Ongg. The event helped raise over 27 million Japanese Yen.

Participants
Mainland China
alan
Yao Xinfeng, Zhao Lei, Yu Bin, Tang Xiaofeng, Qian Jun and Liu Yi from "Togi + Bao"
Hong Kong
Jackie Chan
Sandy Lam
Aaron Kwok
Ekin Cheng
Taiwan
Judy Ongg
Japan
w-inds. (Ryohei Chiba, Keita Tachibana, Ryuichi Ogata)
Kosetsu Minami
Kousuke Atari
JAYWALK (Kouichi Nakamura, Masateru Asakawa, Hiroshi Sugita)
Iruka (Toshie Kamibe)
Terumasa Hino
Hideki Togi from "Togi + Bao"
Akina Nakamori
South Korea
John Hoon
JULY (Jang Joon-Woo)

References
 Official website (Japanese)
 Official website (simplified Chinese)

Music festivals in Japan
2008 Sichuan earthquake